Lycuntes or Lykountes was a settlement in ancient Arcadia, Greece. Pausanias wrote that it was located near Nasi, Scotane and Argeathae, which places it in the southern part of present Achaea. 

Its site is unlocated.

References

Populated places in ancient Arcadia
Former populated places in Greece
Arcadian Azania
Lost ancient cities and towns